Echinoparyphium is a genus of trematodes. Intermediate hosts include snails, bivalves and fish. Definitive hosts are mainly birds and mammals.

References 

Plagiorchiida
Digenea genera